The 1985 Virginia Slims of Indianapolis was a women's tennis tournament played on outdoor hard courts at the Indianapolis Racquet Club in Indianapolis, Indiana in the United States and was part of the 1985 Virginia Slims World Championship Series. It was the sixth edition of the tournament and ran from October 7 through October 13, 1985. Second-seeded Bonnie Gadusek won the singles title.

Finals

Singles
 Bonnie Gadusek defeated  Pam Casale 6–0, 6–3
 It was Gadusek's 4th singles title of the year and the 5th of her career.

Doubles
 Bonnie Gadusek /  Mary-Lou Piatek defeated  Penny Barg /  Sandy Collins 6–1, 6–0

References

External links
 ITF tournament edition details

Virginia Slims of Indianapolis
Virginia Slims of Indianapolis
Virginia Slims of Indianapolis
Virginia Slims of Indianapolis
Virginia Slims of Indianapolis